= McConnells Trace, Lexington =

Neighborhood in Lexington, Kentucky

Coordinates: 38.086°N 84.562°W

McConnells Trace is a neighborhood in northwestern Lexington, Kentucky, United States. Its boundaries are Leestown Road to the east, Town Branch Creek to the west, the Bracktown neighborhood to the north, and White Oak neighborhood to the south.

McConnells Trace development began in 2001, so no neighborhood statistics from the 2000 census are available for it.
